Cristoforo Cortese (c. 1399–1445) was a 15th-century Venetian miniaturist, illuminator, and head of the Veneto school of illumination; he was the first major artist in Venice to paint in the late Gothic style. Cortese is widely regarded as the most notable and prolific Venetian illuminator of the first half of the fifteenth century.

Throughout his career, Cortese produced a number of religious, secular, and classical texts. The only documented work by Cortese, however, is St Francis in Glory, an illuminated choir book depicting the death of St. Francis dating from the late 1420s.

The invention of girari is attributed to Cortese; girari being a method of ornamentation with white garlands.

References 

15th-century Italian artists
1390s births
1445 deaths
Year of birth uncertain